The 2012 Kajotbet Hockey Games was played between 26–29 April 2012. The Czech Republic, Finland, Sweden and Russia played a round-robin for a total of three games per team and six games in total. Five of the matches were played in Kajot Arena in Brno, Czech Republic, and one match in Yubileyny Sports Palace in Saint Petersburg, Russia. The tournament was part of 2011–12 Euro Hockey Tour.

Finland won the tournament for the fifth time, winning all three games. It was also their first Czech/Kajotbet Hockey Games win since 2003. From this year's tournament, it's called Kajotbet Hockey Games due to sponsoring by Kajotbet.

Standings

Games
All times are local (UTC+2 for the games in the Czech Republic, and UTC+4 for the game in Russia).

Scoring leaders
GP = Games played; G = Goals; A = Assists; Pts = Points; +/− = Plus/minus; PIM = Penalties in minutes; POS = PositionSource:

Goaltending leaders
TOI = Time On Ice (minutes:seconds); SA = Shots against; GA = Goals against; GAA = Goals against average; Sv% = Save percentage; SO = ShutoutsSource:

Tournament awards
Best players selected by the directorate:
Best Goalkeeper:
Best Defenceman:
Best Forward:
Most Valuable Player:

References

2011–12 Euro Hockey Tour
2011–12 in Czech ice hockey
2011–12 in Finnish ice hockey
2011–12 in Russian ice hockey
2011–12 in Swedish ice hockey
2012 in Saint Petersburg
April 2012 sports events in Europe
Czech Hockey Games
2012
2012
Sport in Brno
Sports competitions in Saint Petersburg